Tanuj Virwani is an Indian actor and model active in the Bollywood industry. He is best known for his role of Vayu Raghavan in the 2017 Amazon Original television series Inside Edge. He has also played integral roles in Alt Balaji's Code M opposite Jennifer Winget and ZEE5's most successful show Poison. He has earlier started opposite Sunny Leone in the racy thriller One Night Stand.
Along with being an actor he has shown a keen interest towards direction and writing and has made several socially relevant short films. He was recently seen in second season of popular web series Illegal of Voot Select.

Career 
He is the son of actress Rati Agnihotri. He started his Bollywood career with Luv U Soniyo, a Hindi movie in 2013, directed by Joe Rajan. He next appeared in 2014 film Purani Jeans directed by Tanushri Chatterji Bassu opposite Izabelle Leite and Aditya Seal.

He next appeared in Jasmine Moses D'souza's One Night Stand opposite Sunny Leone, released in May 2016, then in the 2017 Amazon series Inside Edge, followed by an appearance in celebrity reality TV show Box Cricket League.

He ventured onto the digital medium with the Emmy nominated series Inside Edge in 2017. He then followed that up with the ZEE5 original Poison which turned out to be a massive hit. He also costarred on Alt Balaji's Code M opposite Jennifer Winget. He also played Don character in Disney+ Hotstar original The Tattoo murders opposite Meera Chopra. Tanuj also seen in Murder Meri Jaan opposite Barkha Singh its a comedy thriller web series on Disney+ Hotstar in 2021. In the same year, he was paired opposite Rashami Desai to play the negative role of Sahil Sharma in Nivedita Basu's crime thriller Tandoor.

Filmography

Films

Television

Web series

References

External links 
 Tanuj Virwani On IMDb

1986 births
Living people
21st-century Indian male actors
Sindhi people
Male actors in Hindi cinema
Male actors in Hindi television
Indian male models
Indian male film actors
Indian male television actors
Male actors from Delhi